Antonio Branca (15 September 1916, Sion, Switzerland – 10 May 1985, Sierre, Switzerland) was a Formula One driver from Switzerland who competed in three World Championship races. His motor racing career was allegedly financed by an admiring Belgian countess, the Vicomtesse de Walkiers. Branca mainly competed in privately owned Maserati 4CLT, in Formula One and Two races.

Branca made his Formula One debut at the 1950 Swiss Grand Prix, finishing 11th, and  briefly led the non-championship Formula One race in Circuit des Nations at Geneva in a Simca-Gordini. Branca continued to race in 1951, retiring from the Formula One  and finishing sixth in the non-championship Pescara Grand Prix, but finished competing in Grand Prix racing at the end of the year.

Branca competed at a lower level until the mid-1950s, racing in hillclimbs and participated twice in the 24 Hours of Le Mans race. Racing with a Moretti 750cc, in 1955 the car was not ready and could not be brought to the starting line at the time of the start, and in 1956 the car broke down before his turn behind the steering wheel.

Complete Formula One World Championship results
(key)

References 

1916 births
1985 deaths
Swiss racing drivers
Swiss Formula One drivers
People from Sion, Switzerland
Sportspeople from Valais